The 2017–18 season was AS Saint-Étienne's fourteenth consecutive season in Ligue 1 since promotion from Ligue 2 in 2004.

Squad

Out on loan

Transfers

Summer

In:

Out:

Winter

In:

Out:

Competitions

Ligue 1

League table

Results summary

Results by round

Results

Coupe de France

Coupe de la Ligue

Squad statistics

Appearances and goals

|-
|colspan="14"|Players away from AS Saint-Étienne on loan:

|-
|colspan="14"|Players who left AS Saint-Étienne during the season:

|}

Goalscorers

Disciplinary record

References 

AS Saint-Étienne seasons
Saint-Étienne
AS Saint-Étienne
AS Saint-Étienne